Yusuf Altıntaş (born 7 August 1961), otherwise known as Rambo Yusuf, is a Turkish former football player and coach.

Professional career
Altıntaş began his career with Köseköy Belediyespor, and moved to Kocaelispor in 1982. He transferred to Galatasaray in 1984 where he won the Turkish First division in 1987, 1988, 1993 and 1994. He also won the Turkish Cup twice in 1985 and 1992. He finished his playing career by returning to Kocaelispor in 1994, and played one season with the club.

Altıntaş was part of the Galatasaray squad that reached the semi-final of the 1988–89 European Cup.

International career
Altıntaş played for Turkey between 1984 and 1992 winning 29 caps and scoring two goals.

Managerial career
Altıntaş retired in 1994 at the age of 34.  Following his retirement, he worked as coach or assistant manager, most currently with Bursaspor (as assistant manager of Bülent Korkmaz).

Personal life
Yusuf's father Mustafa Altıntaş, his brother Yaşar Altıntaş, and his son Batuhan Altıntaş all have played professional football in the Turkish Süper Lig.

Honours
Galatasaray
 Süper Lig: 1986–1987, 1987–1988, 1992–1993, 1993–1994
 Turkish Cup:  1984–1985, 1990–1991, 1992–1993
 Turkish Super Cup: 1986–1987, 1987–1988, 1987–1988, 1990–1991
 Chancellor Cup: 1985–1986
 TSYD Cup: 1991–1992, 1992–1993

References

External links

 
  (as coach)
 

1961 births
Living people
People from Kartepe
Turkish footballers
Turkey international footballers
Turkey youth international footballers
Galatasaray S.K. footballers
Kocaelispor footballers
Süper Lig players
Association football defenders